The 1938 All-Ireland Senior Hurling Championship was the 52nd staging of the All-Ireland Senior Hurling Championship, the Gaelic Athletic Association's premier inter-county hurling tournament. The championship began on 1 May 1938 and ended on 4 September 1938.

Tipperary were the defending champions but were disqualified from the championship after fielding an ineligible player in their Munster semi-final defeat of Clare.

On 4 September 1938, Dublin won the championship following a 2-5 to 1-6 defeat of Waterford in the All-Ireland final. This was their sixth All-Ireland title, their first in eleven championship seasons. It remains their last All-Ireland triumph.

Waterford's Locky Byrne was the championship's top scorer with 4-5.

Teams

Overview

The 1938 championship featured no new entrants to the competition. Kerry, a team who had fielded a team throughout much of the 1930s, declined to participate in the Munster Championship.

Galway were the sole representatives from the Conancht Championship and received a bye to the All-Ireland semi-final. There were no representatives from the Ulster Championship.

Summaries

Results

Leinster Senior Hurling Championship

Quarter-final

Semi-finals

Finals

The Leinster final ended in a draw for the first time since 1934.

Munster Senior Hurling Championship

Quarter-final

Semi-finals

Clare later objected to the victory as Tipperary had fielded Jimmy Cooney who was suspended. The objection was upheld and Clare were later awarded the game.

Final

Waterford won the Munster title for the first time in their history.

All-Ireland Senior Hurling Championship

Semi-final

Waterford's first championship match against Galway

Final

Waterford's first All-Ireland final and first championship match against Dublin

References

1938
All-Ireland Senior Hurling Championship